Volodino is a rural locality (a village) in Solikamsky District, Perm Krai, Russia. The population was 13 as of 2010. There are 10 streets.

Geography 
Volodino is located 20 km southeast of Solikamsk (the district's administrative centre) by road. Usovsky is the nearest rural locality.

References 

Rural localities in Solikamsky District